Lofton Alfonso Cooper (1911 – October 5, 1981) was an American jazz saxophonist and clarinetist. He founded the Savoy Sultans and was their leader from 1937 to 1946. He was the half-brother of Grachan Moncur II.

References

External links 
 cmt.com

American male saxophonists
American bandleaders
Big band bandleaders
1911 births
1981 deaths
20th-century American saxophonists
20th-century American male musicians
Savoy Sultans members